The Queenstown Stadium is located in Queenstown, Singapore. It seats 3,800 people, and is opened from 4.30am to 9.30pm.
 

 
The stadium is a 10-minute walk from Queenstown MRT station.
 In 2010 and 2011, it hosted Etoile FC of the S.League.
 2012 saw the return of Tanjong Pagar United

Facilities & Structures
Queenstown Stadium currently has a capacity of 3,800.

Transport
The nearest way to get to the stadium is buy the MRT, but busses are also available.

See also
List of stadiums in Singapore

References

History
 The stadium was built in 1970. It is the first sports complex built in Singapore.
 The stadium was home to the Tanjong Pagar United S.League soccer team up to 2004.
 In 2006, the S.League team Gombak United played their home games at the stadium.
 In 2007, it hosted Liaoning Guangyuan FC of the S.League.
 In 2008, it hosted Dalian Shide Siwu FC of the S.League.
 In 2010 and 2011, it hosted Etoile FC of the S.League.
 2012 saw the return of Tanjong Pagar United

References

External links
 Frank Jasperneite images

Sports venues in Singapore
Football venues in Singapore
Queenstown, Singapore
Singapore Premier League venues
Tanjong Pagar United FC
Sports venues completed in 1970
1970 establishments in Singapore
Étoile FC
20th-century architecture in Singapore